The 1940–41 Magyar Kupa (English: Hungarian Cup) was the 18th season of Hungary's annual knock-out cup football competition.

Final

See also
 1940–41 Nemzeti Bajnokság I

References

External links
 Official site 
 soccerway.com

1940–41 in Hungarian football
1940–41 domestic association football cups
1940-41